Allocnemis montana, formerly Chlorocnemis montana, is a species of white-legged damselfly in the family Platycnemididae. It is found in Malawi and Tanzania. Its natural habitats are rivers and freshwater springs.

The IUCN conservation status of Allocnemis montana is "EN", endangered. The species faces a high risk of extinction in the near future. The IUCN status was reviewed in 2010.

References

Further reading

 

Platycnemididae
Articles created by Qbugbot
Insects described in 1942